Nils-Olof "Olle" Hederén (13 April 1908 – 1976) was a Swedish Army officer. He served as commanding officer of the South Scanian Infantry Regiment and Jämtland Ranger Regiment. Hederén also served as battalion commander in Congo during the Congo Crisis.

Early life
Hederén was born on 13 April 1908 in Stockholm, Sweden, the son of Anton Hederén, an engineer, and his wife Agnes Ohlsson. He passed studentexamen in 1928.

Career

Early career
Hederén was commissioned as an officer in 1931 and was assigned to the South Scanian Infantry Regiment (I 7) as a second lieutenant. He served as a teacher at the Swedish Infantry Combat School from 1936 to 1939 and attended the Royal Swedish Army Staff College from 1940 to 1942 and was again a teacher at the Infantry Combat School from 1942 to 1946. He became major in the staff of the I Military District in 1949 and served in the British Army in 1951 and in 1952. Hederén served in the Jämtland Ranger Regiment (I 5) in 1953 and was promoted to lieutenant colonel there in 1957. In 1958 Hederén served in the French Army and in 1959 he served at the Army Staff. Hederén was appointed Inspector of the Infantry in the Army Staff in 1959. Beside his military career, Hederén was also chairman of the I 5's Shooting Association (I 5:s skytteförening) from 1954 to 1959, secretary in the Swedish Shooting Sport Federation from 1945 to 1947 and Secretary General of the 1947 ISSF World Shooting Championships. He was also a board member of Jämtland County Shooting Association from 1954 to 1959, Swedish Military Sports Federation in 1958 and of the International Modern Pentathlon Union in 1960.

Congo Crisis
Hederén served with the acting rank of colonel as commander of the Swedish Battalion XVIII K from October 1962 to April 1963 and commander of the Swedish Battalion XX K from April 1963 to December 1963. He was the military chief of the Kamina Base and Sector Kamina in the State of Katanga. During this time, the Katangan resistance against Congo's central government was definitively crushed and the breakaway province of Katanga was integrated back into the Congolese government formation. Hederén experienced the final stage of the UN's mandate at the Kamina Base, since it had been maintained and guarded by UN staff for nearly four years. He was the initiator of the reconstruction of the Bukama Bridge and of a major medicine collection for the benefit of the population of Sector Kamina.

Later career
In 1964 he had been transferred to the reserve. After retiring from the military, Hederén was hired by Sveriges Kreditbank as security manager. He stayed in this position until 1973.

Personal life
On 22 October 1938 he married Gunilla Breitholtz (1915–1995), the daughter of captain Gösta Breitholtz and Eva Breitholtz. He was the father of Eva Hederén Flygt (born 1941) and Suzanne Hederén Hultberg (born 1945).

Death
Hederén died on 9 January 1976 and was buried at Norra begravningsplatsen in Stockholm.

Dates of rank
1931 – Second lieutenant
19?? – Lieutenant
19?? – Captain
1949 – Major
1957 – Lieutenant colonel
1963 – Colonel (acting rank during 1963)

Awards and decorations
Hederén's awards:

Swedish
  Knight of the Order of the Sword (1950)
 Jämtland County Schooting Association's Gold Medal (Jämtlands läns skytteförbunds guldmedalj)
 National Federation of Swedish Women’s Auxiliary Defence Services' Silver Medal (Riksförbundet Sveriges lottakårers silvermedalj)
 Northern Scania Officers Union's Silver Medal (Norra skånska befälsförbundets silvermedalj)
 Swedish Sport Shooting Association's Silver Medal (Svenska sportskytteförbundets silvermedalj)

Foreign
  Knight of the Order of the Dannebrog
  King Christian X's Liberty Medal
  Knight First Class of the Order of the Lion of Finland
 Finland Shooting Association's Gold Medal of Merit (Finlands skytteförbunds förtjänstmedalj i guld)
 Norwegian Shooting Association's Silver Medal (Norges skytteförbunds silvermedalj)

Bibliography

References

1908 births
1976 deaths
Swedish Army colonels
People of the Congo Crisis
Knights of the Order of the Sword
Military personnel from Stockholm
Burials at Norra begravningsplatsen